Félix Mathé (1834–1911) was a French politician.

Early life
Félix Mathé was born on 20 November 1834 in Moulins, Auvergne, rural France. His father died when he was three years old, and he was adopted by his paternal uncle, Antoine Félix Mathé. He had a brother, Henri Mathé.

Career
He served as a member of the  Chamber of Deputies from 1883 to 1895.

Death
He died on 27 August 1911 in Moulins, Auvergne.

References

1834 births
1911 deaths
Politicians from Moulins, Allier
French republicans
Members of the 4th Chamber of Deputies of the French Third Republic
Members of the 5th Chamber of Deputies of the French Third Republic
Members of the 6th Chamber of Deputies of the French Third Republic